Vanessa Erogbogbo is a Ugandan private sector development specialist who focuses on sustainable trade. She is the chief of the Green and Inclusive Value Chains Section at the International Trade Centre (ITC).

Life and education 
Vanessa Erogbogbo was born in Kampala, Uganda and lived in several countries. She later moved to England and holds a dual citizenship to Uganda and the UK. Erogbogbo received an MBA from the London Business School, a MSc Information of Technology from Loughborough University and a B.Eng (with Honours) in Civil Engineering also from Loughborough University.

Career 
Before her current position at the International Trade Centre, where she has worked since 2011, she had worked for the International Finance Corporation, the Standard Chartered Bank, and as an entrepreneur. She currently resides in Geneva, Switzerland where the International Trade Centre has its headquarters.

Women and trade 

The International Trade Centre's mission is to foster inclusive and sustainable economic development through trade,and contribute to achieving the United Nations Global Goals for Sustainable Development.  Erogbogbo is the Chief of the Green and Inclusive Value Chains Section at the International Trade Centre, which is a joint agency of the World Trade Organization (WTO) and the United Nations (UN) and projects the idea of inclusivity and sustainability to aid the efforts in creating economic development that is sustainable.  Erogbogbo founded #shetrades, a pioneering initiative promoting womens economic empowerment through trade, it was launched in 2015.   

The equitable participation of women in the market is positively correlated with  GDPs.  In addition to this, women often care for their family and will make sure that household income is wisely used (ie. giving children access to education), which makes women examplary candidates for economic support as it will benefit more than just one individual. Together, these reasons attribute to the reason #shetrades exists, which is a movement that Erogbogbo led towards a sustainable means for women to access markets.

Green and inclusive value chains 
Erogbogbo oversees Green and Inclusive Value Chains as the chief of this section of ITC. The section ensures that MSMEs benefit from trade by working with all stakeholders to embed sustainability and inclusiveness in value chains. A major focus is driving ITC’s efforts on environmental sustainability and climate change.

Writing 
Erogbogbo was a co-author, along with Ester Eghobamien and Elizabeth Pimentel, of the Gender Responsive Investment Handbook: Addressing Barriers to Financial Access for Women’s Enterprise. This work aligns with much of the #shetrades movement Erogbogbo led. Besides this, she has also written several pieces on Women and Trade.

Media and conferences 
Erogbogbo led a talk at TEDx LausanneWomen to introduce some of her favorite success stories in woman-owned businesses and how more can be done to drive this empowerment and lead the future economy.

Erogbogbo has participated in numerous media and speaking engagements, including the WTO public forums that are broadcast on the WTO website. In 2016, Erogbogbo was a panelist with moderators Katherine Hagen and Caitlin Kraft-Buchman with the topic “Women’s Economic Empowerment and Trade: Contributing to the Deliberations and Recommendations of the UN Secretary-General’s High-Level Panel on Women’s Economic Empowerment” all on inclusive trade. When addressing systemic constraints of sustainable development and gender equality as a trade issue, Erogbogbo explained that there is not one singular reason for the supply side constraints, nor one easy solution, but that the transition from development community leading the way of the involvement of the private sector (which is key in resource accessing) is important in providing markets to women. In addition to this, women are already entrepreneurs but they either do not have the opportunities men do, or they do not have the skills to access these opportunities. Erogbogbo supports the leveraging of technology access to women so that women can cross barriers and access markets with less resistance. The following year, Erogbogbo acted as the moderator for the 2017 WTO public forum sessions.

References 

People from Kampala
Living people
Ugandan economists
British economists
Ugandan women engineers
Year of birth missing (living people)
21st-century women engineers